Agesilaus I, son of Doryssus, was the 6th king of the Agiad line at Sparta, excluding Aristodemus.  According to Apollodorus of Athens, he reigned forty-four years, and died in 886 BC.  Pausanias makes his reign a short one, but contemporary with the legislation of Lycurgus. He was succeeded by his son Archelaus. His grandson was Teleclus.

References

9th-century BC Greek people
9th-century BC rulers
Agiad kings of Sparta
886 BC deaths
Year of birth unknown
8th-century BC Spartans